Vikram Bhagvandas Mehta (August 15, 1946 – June 4, 2014) was an Indian mathematician who worked on algebraic geometry and vector bundles. Together with Annamalai Ramanathan he introduced the notion of Frobenius split varieties, which  led to the solution of several problems about Schubert varieties. He is also known to have worked, from the 2000s onward, on the fundamental group scheme. It was precisely in the year 2002 when he and Subramanian published a proof of a conjecture by Madhav V. Nori that brought back into the limelight the theory of an object that until then had met with little success.

Awards 
The Council of Scientific and Industrial Research awarded him the Shanti Swarup Bhatnagar Prize for Science and Technology in 1991 for his work in algebraic geometry.

References

External links
  Vikram Bhagvandas Mehta citation

20th-century Indian mathematicians
Living people
1946 births
Recipients of the Shanti Swarup Bhatnagar Award in Mathematical Science